Benedetto Cairoli (28 January 1825 – 8 August 1889) was an Italian politician.

Biography
Cairoli was born at Pavia, Lombardy. From 1848 until the completion of Italian unity in 1870, his whole activity was devoted to the Risorgimento, as Garibaldian officer, political refugee, anti-Austrian conspirator and deputy to parliament. He commanded a volunteer company under Garibaldi in 1859 and 1860, being wounded slightly at Calatafimi and severely at Palermo in the latter year. In 1866, with the rank of colonel, he assisted Garibaldi in the campaign in the County of Tyrol, in 1867 fought at Mentana, and in 1870 conducted the negotiations with Bismarck, during which the German chancellor is alleged to have promised Italy possession of Rome and of her natural frontiers if the Democratic party could prevent an alliance between Victor Emmanuel and Napoleon.

The prestige personally acquired by Benedetto Cairoli was augmented by that of his four brothers, who fell during the wars of the Risorgimento, and by the heroic conduct of their mother. His refusal of all compensation or distinction further endeared him to the Italian people. When in 1876 the Left came into power, Cairoli, then a deputy of sixteen years' standing, became parliamentary leader of his party.

Prime Minister of Italy; 1st term

After the fall of Depretis, Nicotera and Crispi, formed his first cabinet in March 1878 with a Francophile and Irredentist policy.

After his marriage with the countess Elena Sizeo of Trent, he permitted the Irredentist agitation to carry the country to the verge of a war with Austria. General irritation was caused by his and Count Corti's policy of clean hands at the Berlin Congress, where Italy obtained nothing, while Austria-Hungary secured a European mandate to occupy Bosnia and Herzegovina. A few months later the attempt of Giovanni Passannante to assassinate King Humbert at Naples (17 November 1878) caused his downfall, in spite of the courage displayed and the severe wound received by him in protecting the king's person on that occasion. Agostino Depretis became his successor (details here).

Prime Minister of Italy; 2nd term

On 3 July 1879 Cairoli returned to power, and in the following November formed with Depretis a coalition ministry, in which he retained the premiership and the foreign office. Confidence in French assurances, and belief that Britain would never permit the extension of French influence in North Africa, prevented him from foreseeing the French occupation of Tunis (11 May 1881). In view of popular indignation he resigned in order to avoid making inopportune declarations to the chamber.

Later life

Thenceforward he practically disappeared from political life. In 1887 he received the knighthood of the Annunziata, the highest Italian decoration, and on 8 August 1889 died while a guest of King Umberto in the royal palace of Capodimonte near Naples.

Cairoli was one of the most conspicuous representatives of that type of Italian public men who, having conspired and fought for a generation in the cause of national unity, were despite their valour little fitted for the responsible parliamentary and official positions they subsequently attained; and who by their ignorance of foreign affairs and of internal administration unwittingly impeded the political development of their country.

References

Further reading

1825 births
1889 deaths
Politicians from Pavia
People of the Kingdom of Lombardy–Venetia
Politicians of Lombardy
Historical Left politicians
Dissident Left politicians
Prime Ministers of Italy
Foreign ministers of Italy
Presidents of the Chamber of Deputies (Italy)
Deputies of Legislature VIII of the Kingdom of Italy
Deputies of Legislature IX of the Kingdom of Italy
Deputies of Legislature X of the Kingdom of Italy
Deputies of Legislature XI of the Kingdom of Italy
Deputies of Legislature XII of the Kingdom of Italy
Deputies of Legislature XIII of the Kingdom of Italy
Deputies of Legislature XIV of the Kingdom of Italy
Deputies of Legislature XV of the Kingdom of Italy
Deputies of Legislature XVI of the Kingdom of Italy